Route 110 is a numbered state highway running  wholly within the town of South Kingstown in Rhode Island. It serves to connect the University of Rhode Island to points south via U.S. Route 1 (US 1).

Route description
Route 110 begins at US 1 near the village of Perryville in the town of South Kingstown. The route heads north for  following Ministerial Road through the wetlands of the Great Swamp. Along the way it intersects with the William C. O'Neill Bike Path Soon after crossing some railroad tracks, Route 110 ends at an intersection with Route 138 in the village of West Kingston.

History
Route 110 was assigned to Ministerial Road by 1969.

Major intersections

References

External links

2019 Highway Map, Rhode Island

110
Transportation in Washington County, Rhode Island